Terry Malone is an American football coach for the Bowling Green Falcons. He currently serves as the team’s running backs coach and offensive coordinator

Playing career 

Born in Buffalo, New York and raised in Redford, Michigan, Malone played four seasons as a tight end at Holy Cross, where he was the Crusaders' captain during his senior season. He also earned a bachelor's degree in history.

Coaching career

Early coaching career 
Malone began his coaching career as a graduate assistant at Arizona in 1983 before moving on to his alma mater, Holy Cross, in 1985 to coach tight ends. He served as offensive line coach, tight ends coach, and offensive coordinator at Bowling Green from 1986-1995, where he was a part of two Mid-American Conference championships. He also spent the 1996 season as the offensive line coach at Boston College.

Michigan 

Malone was the offensive line coach at Michigan from 1997 to 2005. He took over the offensive coordinator role in 2002

Saints 
Originally going to the New England Patriots, Malone was hired away by Sean Payton, and became a part of his coaching staff in 2006 and helped the Saints capture their lone Super Bowl title in 2009. He left after the 2014 season.

Purdue 
Malone was hired February 22, 2015, to coach tight ends at Purdue. On Dec. 22, 2015 he was promoted to Offensive Coordinator after the team fired John Shoop. However he only lasted in that role for one season.

References 

Living people
Year of birth missing (living people)
Sportspeople from Buffalo, New York
Sportspeople from Wayne County, Michigan
American football tight ends
Bowling Green Falcons football coaches
People from Redford, Michigan
Coaches of American football from Michigan
Western Michigan Broncos football coaches
Purdue Boilermakers football coaches
Michigan Wolverines football coaches
Boston College Eagles football coaches
Holy Cross Crusaders football coaches